The PDP-12 (Programmed Data Processor) was created by Digital Equipment Corporation (DEC) in 1969 and was marketed specifically for science and engineering. It was the third in the LINC family and its main uses were for applications in chemistry, applied psychology, patient monitoring and industrial testing. It is the combination of the LINC computer and the PDP-8 and can run programs for either computer. It features a single central processor with two distinct operating modes, each with its own instruction set that allows it to run both computers' programs.

Because it is the combination of two different computers it is very versatile. It can be a laboratory-oriented machine with several facilities for I/O, auxiliary storage, and control and sensing for external equipment or a general purpose computer with a flexible I/O capability that can support multiple peripheral devices. The basic package came with dual LINCtape drives, a scope display and I/O ports for interfacing with external laboratory equipment and peripherals. In addition to a display-based OS other software packages were included for data acquisition and display, Fourier analysis and mass spectrometry.

Operating systems
Although an OS/8 variant named OS/12 was the predominant PDP-12 operating system, there were two prior ones:
 LAP6-DIAL (Display Interactive Assembly Language)
 DIAL-MS (Mass Storage; this is an 8K version of LAP6-DIAL)

Production and training
Less than a year after its introduction the PDP-12 already had over 400 orders placed and in total 725 units were manufactured before being discontinued in 1972.

Since it was used as laboratory equipment DEC offered a two-week "hands-on" programming course with the purchase of the computer. Classes were held at the main plant in Maynard, Massachusetts or in Palo Alto, California in the US, and also available in Reading in the United Kingdom, Cologne in Germany or Paris, France.

See also
 LINC
 LINC-8

References

Further reading
Clayton, R. (1970). Comparison of the LINC, LINC-8, and PDP-12 computers. Behavior Research Methods & Instrumentation, 2(2), 76.

Computing by computer model
DEC minicomputers
12-bit computers